is a fictional character in the Virtua Fighter series of fighting games by Sega. Sarah is a college student from San Francisco, California who debuted in the original Virtua Fighter. She has made several guest and cameo appearances in other games, notably in Tecmo Koei's Dead or Alive 5 as a playable character.

Appearances
Sarah Bryant was inspired by the Terminator character Sarah Connor. Creator Yu Suzuki said that was his favorite character, "because it is really easy to fight with her. Sarah is a character who fights aggressively: she does not stand still waiting for the opponent's move, but moves ahead. It fully reflects my personality."

Virtua Fighter games
According to the story of the original Virtua Fighter, Sarah is the youngest daughter of the Bryant family, born in 1973. She becomes suspicious of the circumstances surrounding her brother Jacky's horrible accident in the 1990 Indianapolis 500. While she investigated this accident, a mysterious group called Judgment 6 kidnapped and brainwashed her. Her innate fighting sense aroused by the brainwashing, Sarah was sent into World Martial Arts Tournament to deliver the knock-out blow to her brother Jacky.

In Virtua Fighter 2, as the second tournament unfolds, Sarah is still brainwashed. However, J6 could not control her completely during the last tournament, and she failed to carry out her orders. She is further trained over the next year by the Organization to become the strongest fighting machine in the hopes that she will eliminate Jacky.

In Virtua Fighter 3, although Sarah was rescued at the tournament by Jacky, who claimed to be her brother, all of her memories had been wiped clean. Although occasional fragments of her memories began to return as she lived her daily life, she found that they returned far more often during her training. With the hope that prolonged combat will advance her memory recollection, she decided to enter the third tournament.

In Virtua Fighter 4, since the end of the third tournament, Sarah has fully regained her memories. Life went back to normal for all the Bryants, but Sarah still felt a twinge of uncertainty. Even though she has recovered, she remembered all the bad things she had done while under the Organization's control. Worst of all, she remembers trying to kill Jacky. She is also unable to remember clearly enough if the desire to do it was a result of J6's brainwashing, or if it was part of her own wishes all along. When she finds out that Jacky intends to join the fourth tournament, she decides to do so as well, so that she can beat Jacky and resolve matters once and for all.

In Virtua Fighter 5, during the Fourth World Fighting Tournament, it was revealed that J6 had sinister motives for Sarah and she was in great danger. Vanessa offered to protect her and infiltrate the organization when suddenly, in the middle of the tournament, Vanessa disappeared. When Sarah finds out that her brother, Jacky, aims to destroy the criminal organization and has been secretly training for the Fifth World Fighting Tournament, she decides to enter in the hopes she can surpass him and bring peace to her past. Sarah doesn't realize that her efforts play neatly into J6's hands and put her in more danger than ever before.

In Virtua Fighter Kids, Sarah is depicted as a young girl. Like her grown-up self, she is still brainwashed, but it is less serious; it is implied in her ending that Dural just brainwashes Sarah to get Jacky in trouble and to pick on him.

Other appearances and crossovers
The anime series Virtua Fighter portrays Sarah and Jacky as children of rich parents. She has a flying squirrel named Alexander for a pet and travels with Jacky in their RV. Whenever Jacky participates in any Formula One contest, Sarah helps out by doing grid girl duties. She is later kidnapped and brainwashed by Eva Durix to be used as a basis for creating a "Perfect Soldier", Dural. In the series, she first has a crush on Akira but later has feelings for Kage-Maru.

Sarah appeared as a playable character in the fighting game Fighters Megamix (optionally with her VF Kids character model) and a non-playable character in the action role-playing game Virtua Quest. She made a guest appearance as a playable character in Koei Tecmo's Dead or Alive 5 (and its updates Dead or Alive 5 Plus, Dead or Alive 5 Ultimate and Dead or Alive 5 Last Round), joining with Akira Yuki and Pai Chan. An audio-video CD Virtua Fighter CG Portrait Series Vol.1: Sarah Bryant was released for the Sega Saturn in 1995.

Sarah has made cameo appearances in several Sega games. In the shooting game Virtua Cop, a statue of her can be seen before the boss battle takes place in stage 3. In the racing game Daytona USA 2, there is a curve on the Expert course (Virtua City/New Joke City) named after her. Her signature outfit called "VF Suit" appears in the rhythm game Hatsune Miku: Project DIVA 2nd as module for Vocaloid Megurine Luka. Several figures of the character were released by various manufacturers, including Duck Tail, Moore Creations, Takara, Yujin and Sega itself.

On June 1, 2022, Sarah received a skin of Nina Williams from the Tekken series in Virtua Fighter 5 Ultimate Showdown as downloadable content.

Reception
The character was well received, especially for her good looks. Dreamcast Magazine ranked her as the third top "girl on the Dreamcast" in 2000. Maxim included her among the nine top "video game vixens" in 2009, and GamesRadar elected her as having one of the best breasts in video games in 2012. GameSpy editors have also noted Sarah for her sex appeal and skin-tight outfits, as did others such as IGN who described her as a "notable" character and a favorite and as one of "Virtua Fighter legends".

According to Justine Cassell's and Henry Jenkins's book From Barbie to Mortal Kombat: Gender and Computer Games (featuring her on the cover), "Sarah Bryant represents Sega's new breed." Team Ninja's Yosuke Hayashi said she and Akira "carry with them the history of the series" and for this reason specifically asked for those two to appear in DOA5. GameSpy included her in their 2009 list of "extremely rough brawlers" as Sarah "her devastating piston punches tenderize bodies, but it's her absolutely lethal legs that destroys the competition." In a review of Dead or Alive 5 by Eurogamer, Matt Edwards opined that she "fits in" the game "with her sleeveless leather jacket and devastating kicks."

Sarah was listed in GamesRadar's article about attractive video game characters from older games whose low rate graphical in-game models belied their good looks as one of the "ugly polygon 'babes' of yesteryear" for her in-game model in the first Virtua Fighter, describing her original appearance as a "complete with a dead-eyed stare and no upper lip." Sharing the sentiment, UGO stated that "thanks to the magic of 3D imaging, we've come to see Sarah not as the stack of polygons we first encountered back in 1993, but as the voluptuous dime piece seen here today, as she more than fills out that jumpsuit," ranking her tenth in their 2011 list of fighting games' "finest female fighters". She was ranked as the 76th best-looking game woman by Brazilian GameHall's Portal PlayGame in 2014.

References

Female characters in anime and manga
Female characters in video games
Female video game villains
Fictional American people in video games
Fictional characters from San Francisco
Fictional college students
Fictional Jeet Kune Do practitioners
Fictional slaves in video games
Sega antagonists
Video game characters introduced in 1993
Video game mascots
Virtua Fighter characters
Woman soldier and warrior characters in video games